The Kurzweil K250, manufactured by Kurzweil Music Systems, was an early electronic musical instrument which produced sound from sampled sounds compressed in ROM, faster than common mass storage such as a disk drive.  Acoustic sounds from brass, percussion, string and woodwind instruments as well as sounds created using waveforms from oscillators were utilized. Designed for professional musicians, it was invented by Raymond Kurzweil, founder of Kurzweil Computer Products, Inc., Kurzweil Music Systems and Kurzweil Educational Systems with consultation from Stevie Wonder; Lyle Mays, an American jazz pianist; Alan R. Pearlman, founder of ARP Instruments Inc.; and Robert Moog, inventor of the Moog synthesizer.

History
In the mid-1970s, Raymond Kurzweil invented the first multi-font reading machine for the blind, consisting of the earliest CCD flat-bed scanner and text-to-speech synthesizer. In 1976, Stevie Wonder heard about the demonstration of this new machine on The Today Show, and later became the user of the first production Kurzweil Reading Machine, beginning a long-term association between them.

In 1982 Stevie Wonder invited Raymond Kurzweil to his new studio in Los Angeles, and asked if "we could use the extraordinarily flexible computer control methods on the beautiful sounds of acoustic instruments?"  In response, Raymond Kurzweil founded Kurzweil Music Systems, with Stevie Wonder as musical advisor. Kurzweil used the sampling technique that had been exploited in reading machines (such as the Kurzweil Reading Machine) and adapted it for music.  Reading machines sample the characters in a text document to produce an image. The machines convert the light and dark areas of the image into text data stored in (RAM) and/or (EPROM), then output spoken text with a text-to-speech synthesizer.

Sound reproduction technique

The Kurzweil K250 utilizes a similar concept:  Sounds are sampled, compressed & converted into digital data, stored in ROM and reproduced as sound via 12 separate DACs and analog envelopes (CEM 3335), which are programmed to simulate the dynamics and sustain of the original sound..   This method was called 'contoured modelling' by Kurzweil in marketing material and regarded as a proprietary scheme.  Bob Moog, then a consultant at Kurzweil, was asked about the method in an article in Electronic Sound Maker in 1985:

This method greatly reduced the number of then-expensive EPROMS needed whilst maintaining the dynamics of the sound, which would be otherwise compromised by compression.  The CEM 3335 integrated voltage controlled amplifier provided  exponential gain to reconstruct the dynamics that were lost in the compression.

A prototype of the Kurzweil K250 was manufactured for Stevie Wonder in 1983.  It featured Braille buttons along with sliders (potentiometers) for various controls and functions, an extensive choice of acoustic and synthesized sounds, a sampler to record sounds onto RAM and a music sequencer with battery-backed RAM for composition.  During production of the Kurzweil K250, at least five units were manufactured for Stevie Wonder.

The Kurzweil K250 was unveiled during the 1984 Summer NAMM music industry trade show.  The Kurzweil K250 was manufactured until 1990, initially as an 88-key fully weighted keyboard or as an expander unit without keys called the Kurzweil K250 XP.  A few years later, a rack mount version called the Kurzweil K250RMX also became available.

The Kurzweil K250 was the first electronic instrument to faithfully reproduce the sounds of an acoustic grand piano. It could play up to 12 notes simultaneously (known as 12-note polyphony) by utilizing individual sounds as well as layered sounds (playing multiple sounds on the same note simultaneously, also known as being multitimbral). Until then the majority of electronic keyboards utilized synthesized sounds and emulated acoustical instrument sounds created in other electronic instruments using various waveforms produced by oscillators, and prior to that there were instruments such as the mellotron and orchestron which used tape loops.  Five other manufactured digital sampled sound musical instruments were available at that time: E-mu Corporation's E-mu Emulator and E-mu Emulator II;  Fairlight Corporation's  Fairlight CMI; and New England Digital's Synclavier I and Synclavier II.

Audio
 "All I Ask of You" – from: Phantom of the Opera composed by: Andrew Lloyd Webber – performed by Christopher McGilton and Nancy Smith using the Kurzweil 250 solely as the accompaniment 
 "Gesù bambino" composed by: Pietro A. Yon – performed by Christopher McGilton and Nancy Smith using the Kurzweil 250 solely as the accompaniment 
 Christopher Yavelow – Countdown (For the Nuclear Age) – The World's First Computer Opera, completely synchronized from the baton of the conductor to the Kurzweil K250 
 Christopher McGilton – Religious/Sacred Music in .mp3 format performed on the Kurzweil 250 and Yamaha MU-50/80 Sound Module  or 
 Craig D. Tollis – The Happy Frog: Kurzweil K250 – Two demo recordings of the Kurzweil 250 
 Jane Brockman – Kurzweil Études: original compositions performed on the Kurzweil 250, listen to 3 excerpts from the Opus One recording:
 Pamela J. Marshall – Spindrift Recordings – Noises, Sounds & Strange Airs, "Child's Play"
 Pauline Oliveros – Dear. John: A Canon on the Name of Cage 
 Steven Johannessen – K250 Demo Music Showcase at the Middle Of Nowhere 
 The Kurzweil 250 Rock Block – Play the 45 RPM Kurzweil 250 Demo Record virtually! 
 The Kurzweil Rocks! – Play the 45 RPM Kurzweil 250 Demo Record virtually!
 The Virtual Kurzweil 250 Sound Sheet – Play the 45 RPM Kurzweil 250 Demo Record virtually!
 Philipp Koltsov – Russian composer & pianist plays Kurzweil 250's patch #1 Grandpiano Demo

Audio and video
 ASJ Avantius – Muzika u domaćoj kinematografiji ( II DEO ) 
 Bach's Nightmare: The Ultimate Rape, or The Art of Kitsch 
 CBS News Interview with Joel Spiegelman in September 1988 on New Age Bach and the Kurzweil 250  
 Chick Corea Electrik Band – "The Dragon" (Note the Kurzweil 250 is to Chick's left on the bottom and string sounds are played on it during the performance) 
 Christopher McGilton – "Magnificat" performed on the Kurzweil 250 and Yamaha MU-80 Sound Module – 
 Christopher McGilton – "No Greater Love" performed on the Kurzweil 250 and Yamaha MU-80 Sound Module – 
 Clinton S. Clark – Film Scoring Portfolio 
 FX – Kevin Loch at Lisner Auditorium, Nov. 8, 1986 
 Joel Spiegelman Interview on the Joe Franklin Show, August 1988 
 Keith Emerson – Emerson, Lake and Powell with Paul Shaffer and the CBS Orchestra on the Late Show with David Letterman (Note that two Kurzweil K250's are being played live – one by Keith Emerson and the other by Paul Shaffer) 
 Kurzweil – It all started with Ray Kurzweil – The story of Stevie Wonder's technical challenge to Ray Kurzweil that ultimately motivates the inception of Kurzweil Music Systems. 
 Kurzweil 250 Demo Cassette (Jazz / Orchestral demo from a great sampler-synth) 
 Kurzweil 250 Demo Cassette (with voiceover explaining history and features) 
 Kurzweil 250 Rock Block Demo 33 1/3 RPM Record 
 Mutabaruka – "The Mystery Unfolds" 
 Pat Metheny Group – "Daulton Lee" (information in Italian) 
 Ray Kurzweil – Ray Kurzweil Appearing on Worldnet – Demonstration of the Kurzweil 250 
 Robert Estrin – Piano Questions: A Great Digital Piano – The Kurzweil K250 
 Santino Famulari – "La Campanella" on a Kurzweil 250 – 
 Steven Johannessen – Visual Music Showcase at the Middle Of Nowhere 
 The Big Cruise – "Don Lampasone" (ASCAP) 
 The Mosquito 
 Wayne Shorter Quartet – "The Last Silk Hat" (North Sea Jazz, 1986)

References

External links
 Sound on Sound – Size Does Matter Kurzweil K250 Workstation Keyboard (Retro) 
 Sound on Sound – Synth Secrets 
 The Age of Spiritual Machines  or 
 The Man and the Machine:An Interview With Ray Kurzweil 
 Time Magazine – Can We Talk? An article about Speech-to-Text recognition and about the Kurzweil 250 
 Virtual Organ – Virtual Instruments:Joe Barron, Present at the 1984 NAMM Show when the Kurzweil 250 was introduced: 
 What's New In Electronic Music; The Art Advances At Warp Drive: A. Arnold Anderson, New York Times 
 Synthony's Synth & MIDI Museum 
 Mastering the Kurzweil 250, Volume One: User's Guide and Volume Two: Reference Manual, Copyright 1988 Kurzweil Music Systems, Inc. 
 Synrise – Brief information on the Kurzweil 250 (In German) 
 Byrd, Donald, & Yavelow, Christopher (1986). The Kurzweil 250 Digital Synthesizer. Computer Music Journal 10, no. 1, pp. 64–86.

External links
 Kurzweil Music Systems
 Kurzweil K250 Users' Group
 The Audio Playground Synthesizer Museum

Kurzweil synthesizers
Samplers (musical instrument)